Donaborów  is a village in the administrative district of Gmina Baranów, within Kępno County, Greater Poland Voivodeship, in west-central Poland.

The village has an approximate population of 501.

References

Villages in Kępno County